Pseudosphex tetrazona is a moth of the subfamily Arctiinae. It was described by George Hampson in 1898. It is found in Brazil and Bolivia.

References

Pseudosphex
Moths described in 1898